Untold: Caitlyn Jenner is a 2021 American biographical documentary film made for Netflix and directed by Crystal Moselle. The film was released on August 24, 2021.

Summary 
The film is the third installment in the nine-part Untold documentary film series. Its story focuses on the life and Olympic career of Caitlyn Jenner, who won the gold medal in decathlon at the 1976 Montreal Olympics.

References

External links 
 
 Official trailer
 

2021 films
2021 documentary films
American sports documentary films
American biographical films
Documentary films about LGBT sportspeople
Transgender-related documentary films
2021 LGBT-related films
American LGBT-related films
2020s English-language films
2020s American films
Netflix original documentary films